The Kandhamal gang rape case was a crime in Ranaghat, Nadia district, of the Indian state of West Bengal, in March 2015. A 71-year-old Syro-Malankara Catholic nun was gang raped by eight men who robbed a Catholic missionary school. Before the attack, school officials told police that they received death threats. The rape was initially blamed on Hindu groups without any evidence by activists like Rana Ayyub and others. However, On March 26, 2015, two Muslim men were arrested for the crimes. Two Bangladeshi nationals were detained on March 20, 2015, on suspicion of their involvement in the sexual assault of the 71-year-old nun at the Ranaghat convent school six days prior, police said. North Dinajpur Superintendent of Police S. W. Reza said that the two suspects — Mukul Alam (28) and Md Majid (29) — bore a striking resemblance to those caught on the CCTV camera at the Convent of Jesus and Mary school on March 14, one of them having 75 percent similarity.

Reaction
Cardinal Baselios Cleemis met the victim in the hospital and told the press that "such inhuman acts should be stopped. We request the authorities to ensure that justice is done and made visible".

See also
 1998 attacks on Christians in southeastern Gujarat
 Jhabua nuns rape case

References

2015 crimes in India
Crime in West Bengal
Incidents of violence against women
March 2015 crimes in Asia
March 2015 events in India
Gang rape in India
Violence against women in India
Violence against Christians in India
Rape in India